Leah MacRae is a British actress and writer. She is best known for her roles in Rab C. Nesbitt,The Karen Dunbar Show, Gary Tank Commander, River City and Grownups.  She is also known for starring in theatrical productions around Scotland and the rest of the UK, most notably at King's Theatre, Glasgow and Edinburgh Playhouse; starring in ‘51 Shades Of Maggie’.

MacRae was born in Belfast but grew up in South England and Glasgow, where she currently resides.

MacRae is a writer of comedy; she wrote and performed her very own one woman show ‘Leah MacRae: My Big Fat Fabulous Diary’ which she toured around Scotland in 2019, every performance was sold out. 

She followed this up with her second one woman comedy show ‘Leah MacRae: Weighs In’ in 2022 which she debuted at The Edinburgh Fringe Festival, followed by a central Scotland tour and two performances at The Soho Theatre, London.

References

External links

Living people
Scottish television actresses
Scottish soap opera actresses
Year of birth missing (living people)